Rączna  is a village in the administrative district of Gmina Liszki, within Kraków County, Lesser Poland Voivodeship, in southern Poland. The village has a population of 1,656.

References

Villages in Kraków County